Limba may refer to:

The Limba people (Cameroon)
The Limba language (Cameroon)
The Limba people (Sierra Leone)
The Limba language (Sierra Leone)
The Terminalia superba, a tree in West Africa.
Limba, Panchthar, a Village Development Committee in Nepal
Limba, a village in Ciugud Commune, Alba County, Romania
LIMBA, Long Island Metro Business Action, a business organization on Long Island in New York state